Brainware University is a leading private university located in Barasat, Kolkata, West Bengal, India. It was established on February 25, 2016 under the West Bengal Act XXXI of 2015 as Brainware University Act 2015 passed by the West Bengal Legislature. It is part of the Brainware Group of Institutions.
Brainware University, recognized by the University Grants Commission (UGC),. is a state unitary university with the right to confer degrees as per Section 22(1) of the UGC Act, 1956.

History
Brainware university offers on-campus  UG, PG, Doctoral and Diploma programmes. The journey of Brainware began as one of the top private engineering colleges in West Bengal and became the heart of  IT education. Eventually, emmerging as the a leading private university in West Bengal, established on February 25, 2016 under the West Bengal Act XXXI of 2015 as Brainware University Act 2015 passed by the West Bengal Legislature.

Approvals and Recogntions
University Grants Commission,
Association of Indian Universities,
Ministry of Education, Indian Nursing Council, West Bengal Nursing Council or the WBNC, Department of Scientific & Industrial Research or the DSIR, Pharmacy Council of India, Ministry of MSME, Bar Council of India, Computer Society of India, Unnat Bharat Abhiyan, Institution Innovation Council.

Awards
ABP Shikkha Shamman 2022, Times Business Award 2022, Education Eminence 2022, ZEE 24 Ghanta 2017 & 2018, Unnat Bharat Abhiyan Perrenial Assistance Award 2021

Campus, Infrastructure & Amenities

Brainware University is built on a  Barasat campus, located at Barasat Kazipara (Near Jagadighata Market). It is a 5 minutes drive from the Barasat Chapadali bus stand and a 10-minute drive away from the Barasat Railway Junction. The nearest airport is Netaji Subhash Chandra Bose International Airport at Dum Dum, Kolkata.

Only 25Kms away from Kolkata, Barasat is the administrative headquarters of North 24 Paraganas; a city well-connected by the Eastern Railway and the National Highways 12 and 112. Brainware University, West Bengal has become the first-choice academic destination for ambitious students from across India. The 9-acre campus is home to over 10000 students from across India.

The state-of-the-art global learning campus of Brainware University is equipped with advanced research laboratories. The infrastructural standard is at par with the top -performing education institutes. 

The University has already established a benchmark for delivering quality education at an affordable cost. Students have access to world-class infrastructure with advanced research facilities, modern industry-standard labs and workshops, selecting from tailormade job-oriented programmes, rewarding scholarships, the guidance of highly experienced faculty, varsity-industry interface programmes, international collaboration, outstanding placement and excellent placement support, pre-placement training from day one, active involvement in social outreach programs, entrepreneurship development cell for the budding entrepreneurs are a few of the prominent features. 

Besides on-campus hostels, multisport arenas, clinics for mental healthcare, general healthcare, and physical fitness along with on-campus allied healthcare labs are available to the Brainware students.

Governance
Mr. Phalguni Mookhopadhayay, is the Founder Chancellor of Brainware University. Prof. Shankar Gangopadhayay holds the office of Vice Chancellor.

Academic Programmes
Brainware University programmes are carefully curated to advocate promising career-building opportunities for scholars. The curricula are designed jointly by academicians and industry experts keeping at par with the benchmark of global excellence. Learning through extensive practical exposure in the form of extended lab training, hands-on training, industry or hospital visits, knowledge partnership, internship or clinical observership, followed by campus-to-corporate training makes the Brainware University students industry-ready by the programme-end. 

Currently, the university offers over 55 undergraduate, post-graduate degrees along with diploma and doctoral programmes in the field of Management, Engineering, Computer Science, Media Science, Multimedia, Law, Commerce, Pharmacy, Biotechnology, Agriscience, Nutrition Science, Nursing, Allied Health Sciences, and Skill Development are taught through ten different schools. 

Brainware University Schools of Learning

School of Engineering 

School of Biotechnology & Bioscience

School of Agriculture

School of Management 

School of Law 

School of Medical & Allied Health Science

School of Communication, Multimedia & Film Studies

School of Humanities & Social Sciences 

School of Skill Development

Campus Placement

Brainware University was adjudged the Best University in Infrastructure, Education and Placement by the Times of India Business Award 2022. In the past six years, Brainware has achieved a magical figure of 98% placements. The University has also earned high ratings from recruiters. 

Brainware University has a dedicated Campus-to-Corporate team who hand-hold the students throughout their academic journey. Right from the start, students are rigorously trained by the Placement Trainers in business communication skills, soft skills, aptitude personality grooming. 

The Campus-to-Corporate team, also known as the Placement Team, has designed a one-of-a-kind intensive grooming session known as the Placement Bootcamp. These are short, rigorous, interactive sessions arranged at regular intervals. Students and trainers share a common interactive platform with the recruiters of top companies. The trainees are conditioned to upskill themselves based on the trending job market, followed by situation role-play, quizzes, and other intra-group competitions. Placement Bootcamps are especially important in boosting professional qualities and confidence among students from the early days.

Campus Life

Anandadhara is the annual fest of the university that takes place in the university. Creative Communion is an inter-college mega-event that Brainware University hosts. Singing, dancing, fashion and band competitions. Texibition is the annual tech-fest at Brainware University where students from all over West Bengal and India participate in prototype model-building competitions, gaming and coding competitions. They have a number of Talent Clubs including Photo Frame, the Photography Club; Communication Club, Cinematography Club; Technology Club.

Research

By December 2022, 418 papers have been published in peer-reviewed (and others) journals. A total number of 113 book chapters were published in the same period of time. 241 conferences were attended by the faculty members of the university. The university currently has 59 patents to its name. 
Brainwave: A Multidisciplinary Journal(ISSN: 2582-659X) is the  quarterly  e-journal of Brainware University. It is a peer-reviewed open-access e-Journal from all the branches of Science, Engineering, Technology, Law, Management, Liberal Art, and Health Sciences.

References

External links
 

Private universities in India
Universities in Kolkata
Educational institutions established in 2016
2016 establishments in West Bengal

PCI Approval| https://www.pci.nic.in/approved_degree_institutes_us__12.html
PCI Diploma|https://www.pci.nic.in/approved_colleges_diplom_us_12.html